Dmitri Vasilyev (born 24 January 1978) is a Russian sprinter. He competed in the men's 4 × 100 metres relay at the 2000 Summer Olympics.

References

1978 births
Living people
Athletes (track and field) at the 2000 Summer Olympics
Russian male sprinters
Olympic athletes of Russia
Place of birth missing (living people)